Hammaad Chaudry is a playwright from Edinburgh, Scotland. His professional debut was in 2018 with the play An Ordinary Muslim at the New York Theatre Workshop.

Early life and education
Chaudry is the son of Pakistani immigrants and grew up in Edinburgh. At the age of 19 he moved to England to initially study law at the University of Surrey. He joined a writing program at the Royal Court Theatre in London which focused on Muslim writers. He later attended Columbia University and was introduced to Tony Kushner who became his mentor.

Career
At Columbia University, Chaudry developed An Ordinary Muslim, a thesis play which would also be directed by Kushner for two readings in 2014. The play opened at the New York Theatre Workshop in 2018 and tells the story of a British Asian Muslim family, The Bhatti’s, and their son’s struggle to belong to different cultural worlds. Directed by Jo Bonney, the play was called "rich and complex" by The Financial Times and selected as The New York Magazine Critic's Pick. Chaudry was also referred to as "no ordinary playwright" by Robert Hofler for his work with the play.

Chaudry's earlier works include Salaam, Mr. Bush, Tokens, Kismat, and God Willing which have played in theaters in both the United States and United Kingdom. He has also received numerous awards for his works.

References

External links
 Hammaad Chaudry at NewDramatists

Year of birth missing (living people)
Living people
British dramatists and playwrights
Columbia University alumni
Alumni of the University of Surrey